As of 2017, American actor Peter Dinklage has won fourteen awards from 61 nominations. He has been nominated for eight Primetime Emmy Awards and 14 Screen Actor Guild Awards, winning four Primetime Emmy Awards, a Screen Actor Guild Award and a Golden Globe Award.

Dinklage began his acting career with a role in the 1995 low-budget independent comedy-drama Living in Oblivion. For starring as a quiet, withdrawn unmarried man in the critically acclaimed comedy drama The Station Agent (2003), Dinklage received nominations for the Screen Actors Guild Award for Best Actor and Best Ensemble. The role also earned him nominations for the Chicago Film Critics Association Award and Online Film Critics Society Award for the film. In 2004, Dinklage won his first Satellite Award for Outstanding Talent.

In 2011 Dinklage gained international recognition playing the character Tyrion Lannister in the HBO TV series Game of Thrones. He won a Primetime Emmy and a Golden Globe Award for Supporting Actor in 2011, and garnered consecutive Emmy nominations for the role from 2011 to 2016, with another Emmy win in 2015; he secured a seventh nomination and third win in 2018 and an eighth nomination and fourth win in 2019. The latter nomination made him the only Game of Thrones cast member to receive a Primetime Emmy nomination for each season. He and the rest of the cast were nominated for the Screen Actors Guild Award for Outstanding Performance by an Ensemble in a Drama Series in 2011 and again from 2013 to 2017. Dinklage was also nominated for the Screen Actors Guild Award for Outstanding Performance by a Male Actor each year from 2013 to 2017. He was nominated for the Critics' Choice Television Award for Best Supporting Actor in 2012, 2016 and 2017.

Dinklage played the character Bolivar Trask, a military scientist who creates a range of robots designed to find and destroy mutants, in the 2014 superhero film X-Men: Days of Future Past, for which he was nominated for an MTV Movie Award for Best Villain.

Chicago Film Critics Association Awards 
The Chicago Film Critics Association Awards are awarded annually to recognise achievement in film making and acting performances. Dinklage has received one nomination.

!
|-
!scope="row"| 2004
| The Station Agent
| Most Promising Performer
| 
| style="text-align:center;"|
|-
|}

Critics' Choice Awards 
The Critics' Choice Awards have been presented annually for outstanding achievements in the film, television and documentary industry. Dinklage has received one award from five nominations.

Detroit Film Critics Society 
The Detroit Film Critics Society are awarded annually to recognise achievement in film making and acting performances. Dinklage has received one award from two nominations.

!
|-
!scope="row"| 2017
| Three Billboards Outside Ebbing, Missouri
| Best Ensemble
| 
| style="text-align:center;"|
|-
!scope="row"| 2022
| Cyrano
| Best Actor
| 
| style="text-align:center;"|
|-
|}

Empire Awards 
The Empire Awards is a British awards ceremony held annually to recognize cinematic achievements. Dinklage has received one award.

!
|-
!scope="row"|2015
| Game of Thrones
| Empire Hero Award
| 
| style="text-align:center;"|
|}

Georgia Film Critics Association 
The Georgia Film Critics Association is an organization of professional film critics from Georgia. Dinklage has received one award.

!
|-
!scope="row"| 2017
|  Three Billboards Outside Ebbing, Missouri
|  Best Ensemble
| 
| style="text-align:center;"|
|-
|}

Golden Globe Awards

Independent Spirit Awards 
The Independent Spirit Awards are presented annually to recognize achievement in independent film. Dinklage has received one nomination.

!
|-
!scope="row"| 2003
| The Station Agent
| Best Male Lead
| 
| style="text-align:center;"|
|-
|}

IGN Awards 
The IGN Awards are awarded annually to recognize achievement in films, televisions and games. Dinklage has received one nomination.

!
|-
!scope="row"| 2011
| Game of Thrones
| Best TV Actor
| 
| style="text-align:center;"|
|-
|}

IGN People's Choice Awards 
The IGN People's Choice Awards are awarded annually to recognize achievement in films, televisions and games. The winners are decided by the public. Dinklage has received one nomination.

!
|-
!scope="row"| 2011
| Game of Thrones
| Best TV Actor
| 
| style="text-align:center;"|
|-
|}

Monte-Carlo Television Festival 
The Monte-Carlo Television Festival is an international festival and competition focusing on productions for television, founded 1961 and based in Monaco. Dinklage has received one nomination.

!
|-
!scope="row"| 2012
| Game of Thrones
| Outstanding Actor in a Drama Series
| 
| style="text-align:center;"|
|-
|}

MTV Movie & TV Awards 
The MTV Movie & TV Awards is an annual award show presented by MTV to honor outstanding achievements in film and television. Founded in 1992, the winners of the awards are decided online by the audience. Dinklage has received one nomination.

!
|-
!scope="row"| 2015
| X-Men: Days of Future Past
| Best Villain
| 
| style="text-align:center;"|
|}

Online Film Critics Society 
The Online Film Critics Society Awards is an annual event of an international professional association of film critics to award achievements in the film industry. Dinklage has received one award from two nominations.

!
|-
!scope="row"|2004
| The Station Agent
| Best Breakthrough Performance
| 
| style="text-align:center;"|
|-
!scope="row"|2018
| Three Billboards Outside Ebbing, Missouri
| Best Ensemble
| 
| style="text-align:center;"|
|-
|}

Portal Awards 
The Portal Awards are awarded annually to recognize and honor achievements in the television and film industry. The winners are decided by the public. Dinklage has received two nominations.

!
|-
!scope="row"| 2011
| rowspan="2"| Game of Thrones
| Best Supporting Actor
| 
| style="text-align:center;"|
|-
!scope="row"| 2012
| Best Actor
| 
| style="text-align:center;"|
|-
|}

Primetime Emmy Award 
The Primetime Emmy Awards are presented annually by the Academy of Television Arts & Sciences, also known as the Television Academy, to recognize and honor achievements in the television industry. Dinklage has received four awards from nine nominations.

Television Critics Association Awards 
The Television Critics Association Awards are presented by the Television Critics Association in recognition of excellence in television. Dinklage has received two nominations.

!
|-
!scope="row"| 2011
| rowspan="2"|Game of Thrones
| rowspan="2"| Individual Achievement in Drama
| 
| style="text-align:center;"|
|-
!scope="row"| 2012
| 
| style="text-align:center;"|
|-
|}

Seattle Film Critics Society 
The Seattle Film Critics Society is a film critic organization of 25 print, radio/TV and internet journalists from Seattle-based publications. Dinklage has received one nomination.

!
|-
!scope="row"| 2017
| Three Billboards Outside Ebbing, Missouri
| Best Ensemble
| 
| style="text-align:center;"|<ref>{{cite web|url=http://seattlefilmcritics.com/2017/12/11/blade-runner-2049-leads-the-2017-seattle-film-critics-society-nominations/|title='Blade Runner 2049 Leads the 2017 Seattle Film Critics Society Nominations|work=Seattle Film Critics Society|date=December 11, 2017|accessdate=December 13, 2017}}</ref>
|-
|}

 Satellite Awards 
The Satellite Awards are a set of annual awards given by the International Press Academy. Dinklage has received two awards from six nominations.

!
|-
!scope="row"|2004
| Peter Dinklage
| Special Achievement Award For Outstanding Talent
| 
| style="text-align:center;"|
|-
!scope="row"|2011
| rowspan="4" | Game of Thrones| rowspan="4" | Best Supporting Actor – Series, Miniseries or Television Film
| 
| style="text-align:center;"|
|-
!scope="row"|2012
| 
| style="text-align:center;"|
|-
!scope="row"|2014
| 
| style="text-align:center;"|
|-
!scope="row"|2015
| 
| style="text-align:center;"|
|-
!scope="row"|2022
| Cyrano| Best Actor in a Motion Picture – Drama
| 
|
|}

 San Diego Film Critics Society 
The San Diego Film Critics Society are awarded annually to recognise achievement in film making and acting performances. Dinklage has received one nomination.

!
|-
!scope="row"| 2017
| Three Billboards Outside Ebbing, Missouri| Best Performance by an Ensemble
| 
| style="text-align:center;"|
|-
|}

 Scream Awards 
The Scream Awards are held annually to recognize films in the horror, science fiction, and fantasy genre. Dinklage has received one award from two nominations.

!
|-
!scope="row" rowspan="2"| 2011
| rowspan="2" | Game of Thrones| Scream Award for Best Supporting Actor
| 
|  rowspan="2" style="text-align:center;"|
|-
| Scream Award for Best Ensemble
| 
|}

 Screen Actors Guild Awards 
The Screen Actors Guild Awards are organized by the Screen Actors Guild‐American Federation of Television and Radio Artists. First awarded in 1995, they aim to recognize excellent achievements in film and television. Dinklage has received two awards from sixteen nominations.

!
|-
!scope="row" rowspan="2"| 2004
| rowspan="2"|The Station Agent| Outstanding Performance by a Male Actor in a Leading Role
| 
| rowspan="2" style="text-align:center;"|
|-
| Outstanding Performance by a Cast in a Motion Picture
| 
|-
!scope="row"| 2011
| rowspan="11"|Game of Thrones| Outstanding Performance by an Ensemble in a Drama Series
| 
| style="text-align:center;"|
|-
!scope="row" rowspan="2"| 2013
| Outstanding Performance by a Male Actor in a Drama Series
| 
| rowspan="2" style="text-align:center;"|
|-
| Outstanding Performance by an Ensemble in a Drama Series
| 
|-
!scope="row" rowspan="2"| 2014
| Outstanding Performance by a Male Actor in a Drama Series
| 
| rowspan="2" style="text-align:center;"|
|-
| Outstanding Performance by an Ensemble in a Drama Series
| 
|-
!scope="row" rowspan="2"| 2015
| Outstanding Performance by a Male Actor in a Drama Series
| 
| rowspan="2" style="text-align:center;"|
|-
| Outstanding Performance by an Ensemble in a Drama Series
| 
|-
!scope="row" rowspan="2"| 2016
| Outstanding Performance by a Male Actor in a Drama Series
| 
| rowspan="2" style="text-align:center;"|
|-
| Outstanding Performance by an Ensemble in a Drama Series
| 
|-
!scope="row" rowspan="3"| 2017
| Outstanding Performance by a Male Actor in a Drama Series
| 
| rowspan="3" style="text-align:center;"|
|-
| Outstanding Performance by an Ensemble in a Drama Series
| 
|-
| rowspan="1"|Three Billboards Outside Ebbing, Missouri| Outstanding Performance by a Cast in a Motion Picture
| 
|-
!scope="row" rowspan="2"| 2020 
| rowspan="2"|Game of Thrones| Outstanding Performance by a Male Actor in a Drama Series
| 
| rowspan="2" style="text-align:center;"|
|-
| Outstanding Performance by an Ensemble in a Drama Series
| 
|-
|}

 SFX Awards 
The SFX Awards are awarded annually for achievements in science fiction and are voted on by the readers of the SFX magazine. Dinklage has received three nominations.

!
|-
!scope="row"| 2011
| rowspan="3"| Game of Thrones| rowspan="3"| Best Actor
| 
| style="text-align:center;"|
|-
!scope="row"| 2012
| 
| style="text-align:center;"|
|-
!scope="row"| 2014
| 
| style="text-align:center;"|
|-
|}

 Washington D.C. Area Film Critics Association 
The Washington D.C. Area Film Critics Association are awarded annually to recognise achievement in film making and acting performances. Dinklage has received one award.

!
|-
!scope="row"| 2017
| Three Billboards Outside Ebbing, Missouri''
| Best Acting Ensemble
| 
| style="text-align:center;"|
|-
|}

Footnotes

See also 
 Peter Dinklage on screen and stage

References

External links 
 

Awards and nominations
Dinklage, Peter